Exo Planet #2 – The Exo'luxion (stylized as EXO PLANET #2 - The EXO'luXion) was the second tour of South Korean-Chinese boy band Exo. The tour began in Seoul's Olympic Gymnastics Arena on March 7, 2015. The tour was officially announced in January 2015 with the first five dates in South Korea. The tour had 39 dates throughout Asia and five dates in North America. 

On August 24, 2015, member Tao filed a lawsuit against SM Entertainment and discontinued his participation in the Exo Planet #2 – The Exo'luxion tour as the remaining nine members continued the tour promotion without him.

Concerts

South Korea
 The tour was officially announced by SM Entertainment on January 15, 2015, with four dates in Seoul at the Olympic Park Gymnastics Stadium better known as Olympic Gymnastics Arena and Olympic Gymnastics Hall.
 Tickets went on sale on January 21, 2015. Due to popular demand, a fifth show was added in Seoul for March 13, 2015.
 Following Exo's first Seoul concert on March 7, reports were released alleging that members Kai and Tao injured themselves while performing and were unable to participate in the remaining stage performances.

Taiwan
 On June 11, Exo traveled to Taiwan for their two-day concert event in light of the MERS concern in Korea. Exo took many precautions to prevent the potential spreading of MERS including wearing face masks and taking an alternative exit at the airport to avoid the crowd. 
 Following Exo's two day stunt in Taiwan, many Taiwanese fans accused the security guards of sexual harassment. Fans claimed that the security guards acted inappropriately during bag checks, often including full body searches, as well as used excessive force to remove fans from the venue. Concert organizer, SuperDome, responded to the accusations by denying any wrongdoing.

China
 Following Exo's two day stunt in Beijing on July 18 & 19, fans became concerned for the members of Exo when photos surfaced showing a laser being pointed at the members' faces by some of the fans in the crowd. Some fans revealed that laser pointers can cause temporary visual problems and be visually distracting.
 While performing "Growl" at a December 12, 2015, show in Nanjing, member D.O. slid several times on a slippery stage surface. After almost falling, he quickly took off his shoes and finished the number in his socked feet. He then put on more slip-resistant shoes, and finished the show without further incident. Fan reviews praised his professionalism in carrying on as he did.

Philippines
 On December 5, netizens clamored that the ticket-selling was announced late, and caused an uproar. It was later announced that the ticket-selling was postponed to December 13, 2015, due to finalizing ticket prices and seat plans, though the concert will push through on the announced date. Upon the final release of tickets, all tickets were sold out within 3 hours.
 On December 19, 2015, due to high demand, a second concert was added to the tour for the Philippines. Exo became the first K-pop group to hold two consecutive concerts in the country.

North America
 On December 1, 2015, My Music Taste released a YouTube video in conjunction with Exo to announce that they would be coming to 5 cities in North America. The announcement included that the fans would get to vote on which 5 cities Exo came to via My Music Taste's official website. Fans had the opportunity to vote by using a free "Make" or by purchasing a "Taste" for US$10. The five cities with the most 'makes' and 'tastes', who reached the 'Green Stage', by the end of the contest would be selected as the winning cities.
 On December 7, 2015, following the end of the voting contest, My Music Taste made the official announcement that the winning 5 cities were New York City, Chicago, Dallas, Los Angeles, and Vancouver. Immediately following the announcement of the winning cities, fans from Atlanta and Toronto placed My Music Taste under the microscope by taking to social media to express their anger towards My Music Taste with accusations that the voting contest had been a scam. Fans heavily scrutinized the process stating that their investigations into the matter showed ‘fake accounts’ being responsible for the sudden spike in votes during the last few minutes of voting. Fans questioned the integrity of the voting process as they uncovered a large number of accounts that shared an ‘adjective-animal-number’ pattern in their usernames and some even shared the same profile picture. Fans attempted to reach out to My Music Taste during the voting process to inform them of the possibility of cheating in which My Music Taste replied to. In an official statement via their social media accounts, they stated that they were aware of the automated ‘tastes’ and ‘makes’ from these ‘fake accounts' but ultimately they had the right to make the final decision on which cities were selected based on the data that they collected from the top 10 cities. Fans from Atlanta and Toronto became certain that the voting contest was a scam after the tour dates for the winning 5 cities were announced only 10 minutes after the winning city announcements.
 On December 8, 2015, My Music Taste responded to the accusations via their official accounts denying any wrongdoing. They explained that the purpose of the 'tastes' were to show that fans were serious about bringing certain artists to their city. If the artist is able to come to a certain city because of voting, the fans who purchased a 'taste' would have received additional benefits such as early ticketing, signed merchandise, and rehearsal access. They announced that due to the overwhelming outrage from fans, they would be issuing refunds for all 'tastes' purchased through their website (even those purchased for other artists and concerts) and discontinuing any additional benefits that would have come with a 'taste' purchase.
 On December 24, 2015, Dream Maker Entertainment made an official statement stating that Lay would not be able to attend the 5 concerts in North America due to his activities in China.
 On February 9, 2016, My Music Taste made an official statement stating that Kai would not be able to attend the concert in Dallas due to a visa delay.
 After the conclusion of the North American leg of Exo's tour, My Music Taste was placed under the microscope again by angry Korean fans who accused them of sexual harassment and discrimination. According to posts circulating among Korean fan sites, Korean fans claimed that they were treated differently from non-Korean concertgoers by being singled out for harsh treatment by security including being strip searched, having their property seized, and being forcibly removed from the venues. My Music Taste responded to the accusations via their official accounts denying any wrongdoing again. They stated that they would investigate the claims and would pursue legal action against all false accusations.

Set list

Tour dates

Box office score data

References

External links
 

2015 concert tours
2016 concert tours
Exo concert tours
K-pop concerts